Mastododera lateralis is the species of the Lepturinae subfamily in long-horned beetle family. This beetle is distributed on the island of Madagascar.

References

External links

Lepturinae
Taxa named by Félix Édouard Guérin-Méneville
Beetles described in 1844